Aliabad (also Romanized as ‘Alīabād; also known as ‘Alīābād-e ‘Alīrezā Khānī, ‘Alīābād-e Bālā, and ‘Alīābād-e Pā’īn) is a village in Takab Rural District, Shahdad District, Kerman County, Kerman Province, Iran. At the 2006 census, its population was 232, in 52 families.

References 

Populated places in Kerman County